Russian land may refer to:
 Ruthenia, a designation for the historical lands of the Rus'
 Any land ruled throughout the territorial evolution of Russia
 Geography of Russia, the land currently ruled by the Russian Federation

See also 
 Russia